is a professional Japanese baseball player who is currently a free agent. He previously played pitcher for the Yokohama DeNA BayStars.

References 

1990 births
Living people
Japanese baseball players
Nippon Professional Baseball pitchers
Yokohama DeNA BayStars players
Baseball people from Okinawa Prefecture